Jennifer Dore-Terhaar (born December 19, 1971 in Montclair, New Jersey) is an American rower, two-time Olympian and World Champion. She competed in women's quadruple sculls at the 2000 Summer Olympics.

Raised in Kearny, Dore graduated from Kearny High School and attended Rutgers University, where she competed as a rower. She graduated from Rutgers in 1993 and was inducted into the school's hall of fame in 2000.

References

External links
 
 

1971 births
Living people
Kearny High School (New Jersey) alumni
People from Kearny, New Jersey
People from Montclair, New Jersey
Rowers at the 1996 Summer Olympics
Rowers at the 2000 Summer Olympics
Olympic rowers of the United States
Rutgers University alumni
Sportspeople from Hudson County, New Jersey
World Rowing Championships medalists for the United States
American female rowers
21st-century American women